Arnos Grove, originally known as Arnolds, is a grade II* listed house in Cannon Hill, Southgate, London.

History

The house was built after the London banker James Colebrooke bought the Arnolds estate in 1719 or 1720. The estate was previously owned by William Whitmore, inherited via Thomas Whitmore from the daughter of William Acton, who purchased from Sir John Weld. The house was later inherited by George Colebrooke and sold to Abraham Hume.

Locals called the estate Arno's, and next owner, Sir William Mayne (later Lord Newhaven), renamed the house and estate Arnos Grove, which is now pronounced as though it never had an apostrophe. In 1777, it was bought by Isaac Walker.

The mansion was described in 1821 by Edward Mogg in Paterson's Roads as:

The New River loop ran through the Arnos Grove estate until the nineteenth century. Upon the death of Taylor Walker in 1918, Arnos Grove was left to his son Richard Walker while he was still 18. The estate was then purchased by Lord Inverforth who sold the southernmost  to the Southgate Urban District Council, which created Arnos Park in 1928, and the remainder to property developers.

The Arnos Grove mansion was also sold in 1928 to the North Metropolitan Electricity Supply Company, becoming known as Northmet House. The mansion was subsequently enlarged, with an extension to the south in 1929 followed by one at the north end of the house in 1935, resulting in loss of the portico facing Southgate Green, and encased in red brick. The house was sold to Legal & General in 1975 and renamed Southgate House (not to be confused with Southgate House). In 1997-8 the bulk of the property was converted into a residential care home called Southgate Beaumont with the southern part developed into luxury apartments.

See also
 Arnos Grove
 Beaver Hall
 Minchington Hall
 Southgate House
 Cullands Grove

References

External links

Grade II* listed houses in London
Country houses in London
Arnos Grove
Southgate, London
Grade II* listed buildings in the London Borough of Enfield
Middlesex
History of Middlesex
Houses in the London Borough of Enfield